The Perfect Assistant is a 2008 made-for-television Drama film starring Josie Davis and Chris Potter .

Plot
The movie begins with the hiring of Rachel Partson (Josie Davis) as an administrative assistant at Wescott Public Relations. She is a nice girl, but starts to obsess over her boss David Wescott (Chris Potter). She finds out he has a wife who is dying and a daughter.

His wife soon dies, due to an injection Rachel gives her.  Then Rachel gives a stomach bug to David's business partner, Judith (Rachel Hunter), allowing her to go to New York with David.

Rachel asks her cousin Nora, to watch her house while she is in New York. Nora's computer crashes so she uses Rachel's, who returns from New York and is angry to discover this. Nora confronts her, but Rachel kills her by pushing her down the stairs. Judith and co-worker Wally tell their suspicions of Rachel to David, who later fires her.

Rachel thinks he only fired her so he can date her without being an employee. She shows up at David's house, who tells her he doesn't love her. When he throws a dinner party for the employees who secured a deal with a major company. Rachel shows up, threatens David with a gun and takes everyone hostage. Rachel unloads her anger onto them and shoots Judith. The police arrive and arrest Rachel.

The film ends with Rachel writing a letter to David that says she looks forward to seeing him. She is shown to be in jail.

Production

The movie was filmed almost entirely in Ottawa, Ontario, Canada. Locations include Sparks Street, Casino Lac Leamy (in Gatineau), The Glebe neighborhood, and the Glebe Collegiate Institute. The Arboretum park adjacent to the Rideau Canal was used as Central Park.

Some exterior shots were taken in New York City.

Distribution
The Film was produced by the Lifetime Network in the United States, with Showcase, and The Movie Network in Canada.

International release of the film in: Italy (as Amore senza pietà), France (as Une assistante presque parfaite), the Netherlands, Argentina (as La asistente perfecta), Germany, the Czech Republic, Hungary, Greece, and Australia.

Cast
 Josie Davis as Rachel Partson
 Chris Potter as David Wescott
 Rachel Hunter as Judith Manion
 Veronique-Natale Szalankiewicz as Isabelle Wescott
 Jason Harper as Wally
 Deborah Pollitt as Nora
 Sophie Gendron as Mary-Beth
 Samantha Kaine as Lara Steeves
 Ian M. Watson as Grady Bransen
 Paul Hopkins as John Price
 Jennifer Marcil as Carol Wescott
 Caitie Campo as Young Rachel

References

External links

2008 television films
2008 films
2008 thriller films
American thriller television films
Canadian thriller television films
English-language Canadian films
Films shot in Ottawa
Films directed by Douglas Jackson
2000s American films
2000s Canadian films